College of Agriculture, Tripura, established in 2007, is a professional degree college for agriculture in Agartala, Tripura.

Courses
It offers undergraduate B.Sc.(Hons.) Agriculture course.

Accreditation
The college is affiliated to the Tripura University. 
The college is recognized by the University Grants Commission (UGC).

See also
Education in India
Education in Tripura
Tripura University
Literacy in India

References

External links

Colleges affiliated to Tripura University
Educational institutions established in 2007
Universities and colleges in Tripura
2007 establishments in Tripura